The 2016 Liberty Bowl was a post-season American college football bowl game played on December 30, 2016, at Liberty Bowl Memorial Stadium in Memphis, Tennessee. The 58th edition of the Liberty Bowl featured the Georgia Bulldogs of the Southeastern Conference against the TCU Horned Frogs of the Big 12 Conference. It was one of the 2016–17 bowl games concluding the 2016 FBS football season.  Sponsored by automobile parts and accessories store AutoZone, it was officially known as the AutoZone Liberty Bowl.

Teams
The game featured conference tie-ins from the Southeastern Conference and the Big 12 Conference.

Georgia Bulldogs

TCU Horned Frogs

Game summary

Scoring summary

Statistics

References

Liberty
2016 12
2016
2016
2016 in sports in Tennessee
December 2016 sports events in the United States